Leslie Patricelli is the American writer and illustrator of many bestselling books for babies, elementary school children and tweens. Her books include the internationally recognized titles "Potty" and "Toot!".  She is also the writer and illustrator of the much-loved "Rizzlerunk Club Series", including "Best Buds Under Frogs" and "The Big Bad Lies". Her picture books include, the Boston Horn Honor book, "Higher! Higher!", "Faster! Faster!", "Bigger! Bigger!", "Be Quiet, Mike!" and "The Patterson Puppies" series. She illustrated the acclaimed Mini Myth series, as well.

Leslie Patricelli grew up in Issaquah, Washington close to Pine Lake. At college, Leslie Patricelli majored in communications at the University of Washington. She then became an advertising copywriter and illustrator. She worked as a contractor at Microsoft for seven years, where she created and animated many help characters, including Scuzz the Rat for Microsoft Bob, Power Pup for Office '97, and animated Rover the Dog for Windows XP. Patricelli took classes at the School of Visual Concepts in Seattle. She is married to drummer, Jason Vontver. She has three kids who are the basis for the little baby in many of her books.

Books
 Big Little
 Yummy Yucky
 Quiet Loud
 Binky (British title: Dummy)
 Blankie
 The Birthday Box
 No No Yes Yes
 Baby Happy Baby Sad
 Higher! Higher!
 The Patterson Puppies and the Rainy Day
 The Patterson Puppies and the Midnight Monster
 Tubby
 Potty
 Be Quiet, Mike!
 Faster! Faster!
 Fa La La
 Huggy Kissy
 Toot
 Tickle
 Hop! Hop!
 Boo!
 Hair
 Nighty-night
 The Rizzlerunk Club: Best Buds Under Frogs
 The Rizzlerunk Club: The Big Bad Lies
 Bigger! Bigger!
 Big Kid Bed
 Tooth
 Mad, Mad, MAD
 Doggie Gets Scared
 Mommy
 Daddy
 Splash!

References

External links

 Leslie Patricelli's official website

Living people
Year of birth missing (living people)
Writers from Seattle
American children's writers
American women illustrators
American illustrators
American people of Italian descent
21st-century American women